R2000 or R-2000 might refer to:

R2000 (microprocessor), a microprocessor developed by MIPS Computer Systems
Pratt & Whitney R-2000, an aircraft engine
R-2000 program, a Natural Resources Canada program for the construction of energy efficient homes
Robin R2000, a French aircraft